Stanley Alan Corngold (born 1934) is an American literary scholar. He is an emeritus professor of German and comparative literature at Princeton University.

Biography 
Corngold was born in Brooklyn in 1934. In 1957, he received his B.A. from Columbia University, which was interrupted by two years of military service. He then studied Sanskrit at the School of Oriental and African Studies and German at Columbia's graduate school. Having taught at the University of Maryland, Corngold entered Cornell University for his Ph.D. program, receiving his doctorate on Rousseau and Kant under the guidance of Paul de Man, Robert M. Adams, and O. Matthijs Jolles.

In 1966, Corngold became assistant professor of Germanic languages and literatures at Princeton University, and was named full professor in 1981. His research has focused on translating and interpreting the works of Franz Kafka, and he has published widely on modern German writers and thinkers, including Friedrich Nietzsche, Wilhelm Dilthey, Robert Musil, among others. His recent works have focused on the lives and works of philosophers Walter Kaufmann and Thomas Mann.

Among his students at Princeton was Avital Ronell.

Corngold was a visiting fellow at King's College, Cambridge. He received a Guggenheim Fellowship in 1977 and a Berlin Prize in 2010, when he completed a book about Kafka’s professional experience as an insurance lawyer . He was elected to the American Academy of Arts and Sciences in 2011.

References 

Living people
Berlin Prize recipients
Fellows of the American Academy of Arts and Sciences
Columbia College (New York) alumni
Cornell University alumni
Princeton University faculty
Princeton University Department of German faculty
Professors of German in the United States
1934 births